A Promise For Tomorrow is a Singaporean Chinese drama series which aired on Mediacorp TV Channel 8 in 2005. Former actress Chen Xiuhuan, who had effectively retired from showbiz during the 1990s, made a temporary return to acting for the drama.

Synopsis
21-year-old Fang Fang comes from an unfortunate background. Her father Fang Zhen married young and his philandering ways caused his wife Huiyin to leave him. To worsen matters, Fang Fang has to take care of two younger siblings from two different mothers from her father's extramarital affairs and also run the small family business at the same time. Another of Fang Zhen's out-of-wedlock children Fang Xiang is sent to live with them. Adding to Fang Fang's woes, Fang Xiang is epileptic and has cancer.

Cast
Rui En as Fang Fang
Chen Xiuhuan as Huang Huiyin
Huang Wenyong as Fang Zhen
Qi Yuwu as "GG Bond"
Nick Shen
Ix Shen
Constance Song
Eelyn Kok
Mark Lee
Chen Tianwen
Lin Meijiao

Production 
The drama is presented by National Kidney Foundation Singapore.

Reception 
Wendy Teo of The New Paper rated it as 4 stars out of 5.

Accolades

References

External links
A Promise for Tomorrow (English)
A Promise for Tomorrow (Chinese)

Singapore Chinese dramas
2005 Singaporean television series debuts
Channel 8 (Singapore) original programming